Richard Wallace Hall (born September 27, 1930) is an American former professional baseball player. He played in Major League Baseball as a right-handed pitcher from  through  and from  through , most notably as a member of the Baltimore Orioles dynasty that won three American League pennants and two World Series championships between 1966 and 1970. He also played for the Pittsburgh Pirates, Kansas City Athletics and the Philadelphia Phillies.

Biography
He helped the Orioles win the 1966 and 1970 World Series and 1969 and 1971 American League Pennant. Hall was the first pitcher to record a win in League Championship Series play, on October 4, 1969. Hall was the oldest player in the American League in 1970 and 1971. He ranks 22nd on the MLB Career WHIP List (1.102), 39th on the MLB Career Walks per 9 Innings Pitched List (1.69) and 47th on the MLB Career Strikeout to Walk List (3.14).

Hall was acquired along with Dick Williams by the Orioles from the Athletics for Chuck Essegian and Jerry Walker on April 12, 1961. He transitioned from a starting pitcher into a bullpen member, spot starter, and relief pitcher who was paired with relief aces Hoyt Wilhelm and then Stu Miller. Hall's best season came in 1964, when he pitched 87.2 innings with a WHIP of 0.844 and an ERA of 1.85. Hall won the Most Valuable Player award in the Pacific Coast League (AAA minor league) in 1959, his first year playing in the league. He was voted to the Orioles Hall of Fame in 1989.

In 16 years Hall had a 93–75 win–loss record, 495 games, 74 games started, 20 complete games, 3 shutouts, 237 games finished, 68 saves, 1,259 innings pitched, 1,152 hits allowed, 512 runs allowed, 464 earned runs allowed, 130 home runs allowed, 236 walks allowed, 741 strikeouts, 18 hit batsmen, 1 wild pitch, 5,085 batters faced, 70 intentional walks and a 3.32 ERA. In his postseason career, Hall tossed 8.2 innings over 5 games, and did not give up an earned run and only 3 hits, registering 2 wins and 2 saves. As an outfielder he played in 669 games and had 714 at bats, 79 runs, 150 hits, 15 doubles, 4 triples, 4 home runs, 56 RBI, 6 stolen bases, 61 walks, .210 batting average, .271 on-base percentage, .259 slugging percentage, 185 total bases, 34 sacrifice hits and 9 sacrifice flies. Jim Palmer, who learned about pitching from Hall, called him, "One of the great control pitchers ever."

He graduated from Swarthmore College. He is the older brother of linguist Barbara Partee, also a Swarthmore graduate. Hall also played football and basketball and ran track at Swarthmore.

References

External links

Dick Hall at Baseball Almanac
Dick Hall at Baseball Gauge
 Creamer, Robert. "The Invisible Man On The Mound," Sports Illustrated, June 24, 1963.
 "People," Sports Illustrated, April 20, 1970.
 Klingaman, Mike. "Catching Up With ex-Oriole Dick Hall," The Baltimore Sun, Tuesday, May 26, 2009.
 "Letters," Sports Illustrated, September 17, 2001.

1930 births
Living people
Pittsburgh Pirates players
Kansas City Athletics players
Baltimore Orioles players
Philadelphia Phillies players
Baseball players from St. Louis
Basketball players from St. Louis
Players of American football from St. Louis
Major League Baseball pitchers
Major League Baseball outfielders
Burlington-Graham Pirates players
Swarthmore Garnet Tide baseball players
Swarthmore Garnet Tide football players
Swarthmore Garnet Tide men's basketball players
Waco Pirates players
Lincoln Chiefs players
Columbus Jets players
Salt Lake City Bees players
Pacific Coast League MVP award winners